John Shuttleworth may refer to:

 John Shuttleworth (industrialist), Manchester Victorian industrialist
 The founder of Mother Earth News magazine
 John Shuttleworth (character), created by Graham Fellows
 John "Slider" Shuttleworth, British pioneer speedway rider
 A former member of Australian indie pop band The Stems